Rudzki Most  is a district of Tuchola, Poland, located in the south-eastern part of the town, along the west bank of the Brda River. It is on the edge of the Tuchola Landscape Park, and was incorporated into the town limits and jurisdiction of Tuchola in 1955. The district takes its name from wooden bridge over the Brda, which was most recently replaced in 1958 by the current road bridge, part of route 240, and from the Ruda River, which flows through the nearby village of Rudzki Młyn.

The Roman Catholic Parish of Divine Providence is located in the district as well.

German occupation

On October 24, 27 and 30, and on November 2, 6 and 10, 1939, at the beginning of the German occupation of Poland, Germans carried out mass shootings of local Poles, mainly of the intelligentsia as part of the larger Intelligenzaktion Pommern, in the surrounding forests. The priest Franciszek Nogalski attempted to negotiate the release of many those to be executed, but was ultimately killed himself. In 1943 the German occupiers renamed the village Raudenbrück.

After the war, in November 1946, the bones of 227 victims  were exhumed, 34 of which were unidentified, and reburied in Tuchola, where a mausoleum was later built. There is now a monument at the site of the mass graves of the murdered.

See also
Rudzki Młyn
Tuchola Forest

References

Neighbourhoods in Poland
Tuchola County
Pomeranian Voivodeship (1919–1939)
Nazi war crimes in Poland